Trichilia elsae is a species of plant in the family Meliaceae. It is endemic to Acre state in Brazil. It is threatened by habitat loss.

References

elsae
Endemic flora of Brazil
Flora of the Amazon
Flora of Pará
Trees of Brazil
Environment of Acre (state)
Endangered flora of South America
Taxonomy articles created by Polbot